Mansfield District is a local government district in Nottinghamshire, England. Its council is based in the town of Mansfield. The district is bounded by the districts of Ashfield, Newark and Sherwood and Gedling, as well as the Derbyshire districts of Bolsover and North East Derbyshire. It is also part of the Mansfield urban area.

History
The district was formed on 1 April 1974, under the Local Government Act 1972, by the merger of the Municipal Borough of Mansfield with Mansfield Woodhouse Urban District and Warsop Urban District.

Geography

As well as the town of Mansfield, settlements in the district include Mansfield Woodhouse, Forest Town and parts of Pleasley, with Warsop and Meden Vale distanced and annexed by open countryside. The district is entirely unparished apart from Warsop, which retains a parish council.

Mansfield District Council 

Unlike most English councils, Mansfield District Council is led by a directly elected mayor, following a campaign in 2002 by local businessman Stewart Rickersey to achieve a referendum to change the governance away from the traditional CEO (Chief Executive Officer) and elected Chairman-with-Cabinet, composed of councillors entitled Cabinet Members.

The replacement from 2005 was an MD (managing director) as Head of Paid Service with directors, heads of service and line managers providing the council's day-to-day services, together with a mayor (elected by the voting public) holding executive powers and a cabinet composed of councillors, entitled Portfolio Holders.

The mayor of Mansfield is currently Labour's Andy Abrahams, who was returned at the scheduled elections in May 2019, succeeding Mansfield Independent Forum (MIF) political party incumbents Kate Allsop (2015–2019) who followed Tony Egginton, in-post since late 2003, both founding members of the Mansfield Independent Forum. Following the previous elections in 2011, MIF lost overall control having held majority seats from the 2003 and subsequent 2007 elections.

Ward changes and councillors
In time for the 2011 elections, the Local Government Boundary Commission for England recommended new wards and boundaries following a request for a review made by the mayor, resulting in 36 single-member wards.

At the 2011 elections, Mayor Egginton was again successful, but only by a very small margin of 67 votes based on AV – secondary voting – and after two recounts. The council initially comprised 26 Labour members and 10 Mansfield Independent Forum. No Liberal Democrats or Conservatives were elected.

One Labour member – elected for the Park Hall ward – died shortly after the election, with the subsequent by-election again returning a Labour councillor.

Two Labour members – elected to the Bull Farm and Pleasley Hill and Yeoman Hill wards – then changed their allegencies, creating their own Labour 2011 party. The Mayor assembled his Cabinet from Independents and Labour 2011, and, despite Labour holding the majority with 24 (from an initial 26) members, there was no Labour presence on the Mayor's Cabinet.

At the May, 2015 elections, Labour gained overall control, but the new Independent mayor again created a cabinet of Portfolio Holders from elected members who were not Labour. This overall control situation soon changed by a full council meeting that took place on 21 July 2015 with one Labour councillor, Nick Bennett, switching his political allegiance and, together with two UKIP members, joined with the Independent Forum to regain overall control from Labour.

The Mansfield local newspaper reported that Nick Bennett had represented four parties since the start of his political career in 2007, including Conservative and UKIP. As of July, there were no Labour members on Mayor Allsop's cabinet, and at an extraordinary full-council meeting on 2 September, the chairman of the council and all of the Labour committee-lead positions were replaced by Independents.

In late October 2015, a further Labour member, Vaughan Hopewell, switched allegiance to Mansfield Independent Forum, tallying Labour 17, MIF Coalition 19.

In May 2017, MDC Chairman, Councillor Stephen Harvey joined the Conservative Party and became the only Conservative member of the council.

In July 2017, the two UKIP members changed party to Mansfield Independent Forum, citing "UKIP's job is done now that the UK has voted for Brexit", leaving the numbers at 18 Labour and 18 MIF, with the MIF Mayor having the deciding vote.

As of December 2019 the council composition was as follows:

Labour – 15 members (16 including the Mayor)
Mansfield Independent Forum – 13 members 
Independents – 6 members
Conservative – 2 members
Total – 37 members

In 2021, an Oakham ward by-election held following the resignation of Lee Anderson returned another Conservative member.

In September 2022, a new by-election was be held following the death of a sitting member. The successful incumbent is from the Labour Party.

Changes in Chief Executive roles 
Following the 2002/2003 reorganisation into a US-style mayorship with executive powers, long-term CEO Richard Goad departed in late 2005. Successor was Ruth Marlow, as managing director.

In 2015, it was announced that the Managing Director Marlow had departed "by mutual arrangement", with another Director fulfilling the role of interim Head of Paid Service, a legally-required position. Soon after, another Director, who was also the council's monitoring officer – again, a mandatory position – was stated to be leaving by the same "mutual agreement". In a later report relating to Mayor Kate Allsop, the local newspaper commented "In the weeks following the election, major decisions have been taken to axe two leading executives from Mansfield District Council".

Following a successful spell from late 2015 as interim Head of Paid Service when covering for the previous managing director, in 2016 Bev Smith was appointed chief executive officer in what Mansfield Council described as "part of its senior management restructure". She moved on to North West Leicestershire DC in June 2017, replaced by existing employee Hayley Barsby as interim CEO.

Hayley Barsby was then appointed as chief executive officer at the beginning of 2018, from which she announced her resignation in late 2021. In January 2022, the CEO position was advertised at a salary of £115,453, whilst duties were being covered by two existing senior officers as an interim measure. In May 2022, the council announced a new CEO had been recommended. Adam Hill started, as expected, on 1 August.

Arms

See also 
 Mansfield (UK Parliament constituency)

References

External links
Mansfield District Council Home Page

 
Non-metropolitan districts of Nottinghamshire
Populated places established in 1974